Coventry East was a parliamentary constituency in the city of Coventry in the West Midlands.  It returned one Member of Parliament (MP) to the House of Commons of the Parliament of the United Kingdom, elected by the first past the post system.

It was only ever represented by one Member - Labour cabinet minister Richard Crossman.

History 
Until 1945, the city of Coventry was represented by a single Member. Population growth meant that it had grown to 89,001 electors at the time of the 1935 general election, and in the 1939 electoral register it had 87,487 electors. The County Borough of Coventry had also expanded its boundaries in the late 1930s, taking in an additional 66,425 electors. Two nearby divisions of Warwickshire had exceptionally large electorates: Nuneaton at 112,503 and Tamworth at 118,131. Accordingly, the area was included in the Schedule to the House of Commons (Redistribution of Seats) Act 1944 as abnormally large constituencies to be divided by the Boundary Commission before the first post-war general election.

The Boundary Commission proposed to create two divisions within the new boundaries of the County Borough, with Coventry East comprising ten wards and having a 1939 electorate of 76,860. On the new electoral register compiled for the 1945 general election, the constituency had 74,676 electors on the civilian residence register, 67 on the Business Premises register, and 5,166 on the service register.

A new Boundary Commission review began in 1965 by which time Coventry's electorate had increased and the city was allocated four seats; they were named after the ordinal points of the compass. The recommendations of the Commission came into effect at the February 1974 general election, at which point Coventry East ceased to exist as a Parliamentary constituency.  This coincided with Richard Crossman's retirement from parliament; he died of liver cancer two months after the election.

Boundaries 
1945–1950: The County Borough of Coventry wards of All Saints, Foleshill, Hernall, Hillfields, Longford, Lower Stoke, St Mary's, St Paul's, Upper Stoke, and Walsgrave.

1950–1974: The County Borough of Coventry wards of Charterhouse and Binley, Longford, Lower Stoke, Upper Stoke, and Walsgrave.

Members of Parliament

Election results

References 

Parliamentary constituencies in Coventry
Parliamentary constituencies in the West Midlands (county) (historic)
Constituencies of the Parliament of the United Kingdom established in 1945
Constituencies of the Parliament of the United Kingdom disestablished in 1974